The COVID-19 National Trust Fund was established by an act of Parliament (Act 1013) to mobilize funds to be used in complementing the government's efforts to address the COVID-19 pandemic in Ghana. It is managed by a 7-member board of trustees chaired by the former Chief Justice Sophia Akuffo

References

COVID-19 pandemic in Ghana